Ramanathapuram West Government Tamil Mixed School ( Irāmanātapuram Mēṟku Araciṉar Tamiḻ Kalavaṉ Pāṭacālai) is a provincial school in Vaddakkachchi, Sri Lanka.

See also
 List of schools in Northern Province, Sri Lanka

References

Provincial schools in Sri Lanka
Schools in Kilinochchi District